George Francis Pyne III (July 12, 1941 – November 26, 2015) was an American football defensive tackle who played one season with the Boston Patriots of the American Football League (AFL). He was drafted by the Boston Patriots in the sixteenth round of the 1965 AFL Draft. He played college football at Olivet College and attended Milford High School in Milford, Massachusetts. Pyne's father George Pyne II and son Jim Pyne both played in the 
NFL. The Pynes were the first family to have three generations play professional football. His son George played football at Brown University and is a businessman. Pyne died on November 26, 2015 from cancer.

References

External links
Just Sports Stats

1941 births
2015 deaths
Players of American football from Massachusetts
American football defensive tackles
Olivet Comets football players
Boston Patriots players
People from Milford, Massachusetts
Deaths from cancer in Massachusetts
American Football League players
Sportspeople from Worcester County, Massachusetts